Events from the year 1210 in Ireland.

Incumbent
Lord: John

Events
 King John’s second visit to Ireland.
 Earldom of Ulster and Honor of Limerick are confiscated.
 Submission of Irish kings.
 King John sets up a civil government in Ireland.

Deaths
 Risteárd de Tiúit, Norman invader and Lord Chief Justice of Ireland.

References

 
1210s in Ireland
Ireland
Years of the 13th century in Ireland